Joe Schroeder (born 14 June 1993) is an American rugby player who plays for the United States national rugby sevens team on the World Rugby Sevens Series. He debuted for the U.S. national team at the 2017 Dubai Sevens. He missed a chunk of 2018 due to a shoulder injury. He played in the 2019 Pan Am Games and was named in the American squad for the Rugby sevens at the 2020 Summer Olympics.

Schroeder was raised in Indianapolis and attended Cathedral High School. He began playing rugby union at the age of 15 in high school, and also played American football as a defensive end, as well as playing basketball. He competed in cheerleading while he attended Trine University since they did not have a rugby team.
He is a devout Roman Catholic.

References 

1993 births
Living people
American rugby union players
American rugby sevens players
Olympic rugby sevens players of the United States
Rugby sevens players at the 2020 Summer Olympics
Pan American Games bronze medalists for the United States
Pan American Games medalists in rugby sevens
Rugby sevens players at the 2019 Pan American Games
Medalists at the 2019 Pan American Games
Trine University alumni
Sportspeople from Indianapolis
American Roman Catholics